The Ambassador Extraordinary and Plenipotentiary of the Russian Federation to the Plurinational State of Bolivia is the official representative of the President and the Government of the Russian Federation to the President and the Government of Bolivia.

The ambassador and his staff work at large in the Embassy of Russia in La Paz.

History of diplomatic relations

Diplomatic relations between Bolivia and Russia date back to the 19th century. On 9 August 1898 the Bolivian ambassador to Paris, Francisco de Argadonia, presented his credentials to Emperor Nicholas II and was thereafter accredited as Bolivia's envoy to Russia. 

Relations at the mission level between the Soviet Union and Bolivia were first established on 18 April 1945. There was no formal exchange of ambassadors however until 1969, when embassies were opened in both capitals. The first Soviet ambassador to Bolivia, was appointed on 26 March 1970. With the dissolution of the Soviet Union in 1991, the Soviet ambassador, continued as representative of the Russian Federation until 1995.

List of representatives (1970 – present)

Representatives of the Soviet Union to Bolivia (1970 – 1991)

Representatives of the Russian Federation to Bolivia (1991 – present)

References

 
Bolivia
Russia